José Oswaldo Calel (born 8 August 1998) is a Guatemalan racewalking athlete. He represented Guatemala at the 2020 Summer Olympics in the men's 20 kilometres walk.

Career
Calel represented Guatemala at the 2019 NACAC U23 Championships in the 10,000 meters walk and won a silver medal.

He represented Guatemala at the 2020 Summer Olympics in the men's 20 kilometres walk and finished in 30th place.

References

1998 births
Living people
Guatemalan male racewalkers
Athletes (track and field) at the 2020 Summer Olympics
Olympic athletes of Guatemala
People from Alta Verapaz Department
20th-century Guatemalan people
21st-century Guatemalan people